"If You Don't Know Me by Now" is a song written by Kenny Gamble and Leon Huff, and recorded by the Philadelphia soul musical group Harold Melvin & the Blue Notes. It became their first hit after being released as a single in September 1972, topping the US R&B chart and peaking at number 3 on the US Billboard Hot 100.

"If You Don't Know Me by Now" was originally written for Labelle (a trio led by Patti LaBelle) but they never recorded it. The song's composers Kenny Gamble and Leon Huff gave it to Harold Melvin & the Blue Notes, which featured Teddy Pendergrass as lead vocalist,
and the actual background vocals done by producers Kenny Gamble, Leon Huff, Carl Helm, and Bunny Sigler. In addition to the single release, the track was included on their debut album I Miss You.

Patti LaBelle later made the song part of her concert repertoire in 1982; a live version appears on her 1985 album, Patti.

"If You Don't Know Me by Now" has since been recorded by a number of other artists, most notably the English pop and soul band Simply Red, who took their version to number one on the Billboard Hot 100 in 1989.

The song "If You Don’t Know Me By Now" was chosen as one of the "Songs of the Century" by the Recording Industry Association of America (RIAA).

Charts

Weekly charts

Year-end charts

Simply Red version

Simply Red's version of "If You Don't Know Me by Now" was a major commercial success on the charts in 1989, giving the band their second US number one (also topping the Adult Contemporary chart), and peaking at number 38 on the Hot R&B/Hip-Hop Songs chart. This version also won the Grammy Award for the Best R&B Song of 1989. The track was also a number-one hit in Australia and New Zealand; in the latter country, it was the best-selling single of 1989. It reached number 2 in the UK, becoming the band's second top-10 hit after the re-issue of "Holding Back the Years" in 1986, which also reached number 2.

According to the producer Stewart Levine, he did not want too much orchestration on the record, and went with a two-part harmony instead of a three-part harmony. Mick Hucknall admitted he loved Harold Melvin & the Blue Notes' version, and stated he danced to their music when he was 13.

This version can be heard in the films American Psycho (2000) and Class Action (1991) and appears in the game Karaoke Revolution Presents: American Idol. It is also available to download for the Xbox 360 game Lips, which contains the music video.

Critical reception
Jerry Smith from Music Week wrote, "Top-notch purveyors of smooth soul, Simply Red deliver this excellent version of the old Harold Melvin & the Bluenotes classic, lifted from their already platinum-selling A New Flame LP. As a follow up to their "It's Only Love" hit, it's a sure fire winner. Expect mass exposure."

Track listings
 7-inch single
 "If You Don't Know Me by Now" – 3:23
 "Move on Out" (recorded Live Manchester on February 22, 1989) – 5:18

 12-inch single
 "If You Don't Know Me by Now" – 3:23
 "Move on Out" (recorded live Manchester on February 22, 1989) – 5:18
 "Shine" (recorded live Manchester on February 22, 1989) – 3:30

 3-inch CD single
 "If You Don't Know Me by Now" – 3:23
 "Move on Out" (recorded live Manchester on February 22, 1989) – 5:18
 "Shine" (recorded live Manchester on February 22, 1989) – 3:30
 "Sugar Daddy" – 3:30

Charts

Weekly charts

Year-end charts

Certifications

Other versions
In 1976, Jamaican reggae band Zap Pow released a version in the UK on Trojan Records.
The musician Seal recorded the song for his 2008 album Soul. In April 2009, it became his first Top 10 Adult Contemporary hit since "Love's Divine" in 2004. He was also subsequently nominated for the Best Male Pop Vocal Performance Grammy.
 The Voice of Holland contestant Ben Saunders performed the song for the 2010-11 competition. His recorded version went straight to number one in the Netherlands.
A comedic cover version by Ricky Gervais, in character as David Brent, appeared in the 2003 Christmas special of the British comedy series The Office.
Martina McBride recorded for her 2014 album Everlasting.

See also
List of Best Selling Soul Singles number ones of 1972
List of Hot Adult Contemporary number ones of 1989

References

External links
 [ Harold Melvin & the Blue Notes version song review] on AllMusic

1970s ballads
1972 singles
1972 songs
1989 singles
1989 songs
Billboard Hot 100 number-one singles
Black-and-white music videos
Elektra Records singles
Harold Melvin & the Blue Notes songs
Number-one singles in Australia
Number-one singles in New Zealand
Patti LaBelle songs
Philadelphia International Records singles
Rhythm and blues ballads
Simply Red songs
Songs written by Kenny Gamble
Songs written by Leon Huff
Soul ballads